Tycherus is a genus of parasitoid wasps belonging to the family Ichneumonidae.

The species of this genus are found in Europe and Northern America.

Species:
 Tycherus acutus (Gravenhorst, 1829) 
 Tycherus amaenus (Wesmael, 1845)

References

Ichneumonidae
Ichneumonidae genera